Vladimir Sergeyevitch Ignatowski, or Waldemar Sergius von Ignatowsky and similar names in other publications (* March 8/20, 1875 in Tbilisi, Georgia; † January 13, 1942 in Leningrad), was a Russian physicist.

Life and work
Ignatowski graduated in 1906 in Saint Petersburg. 1906-1908 he continued to study at the University of Giessen, with his dissertation in 1909. 1911-1914 he taught at the Higher Technical School in Berlin. Afterwards he worked for different institutions in the Soviet Union. Then he became a corresponding member of the Soviet Academy of Sciences.

Aleksandr Solzhenitsyn reported in his book The Gulag Archipelago, that Ignatowski was put under arrest by Soviet officials, who raised absurd allegations against him. It was claimed that Ignatowski was recruited by the German secret service in 1909, not to spy in the next war (World War I), but to spy in the "war after the next war" (World War II). So Ignatowski was executed in 1942 in Leningrad. He was rehabilitated in 1955.

Ignatowski wrote some papers on special relativity. In 1910 he was the first to try to derive the Lorentz transformation by group theory only using the relativity principle, and without the postulate of the constancy of the speed of light (1910b, 1911b, 1911c, 1911h). Although he derived the correct transformation, the invariant limiting speed remained undefined. Ignatowski had to resort to length contraction of moving electrostatic fields in order to identify this limiting velocity with the velocity of light in vacuum. While some said that this approach was insufficient and the second postulate is still needed, others continued the attempts to derive special relativity without the light postulate (see Postulates of special relativity). Ignatowski also investigated the status of rigid bodies within special relativity (1910a, 1911a). He concluded that velocities greater than the speed of light are possible, even though he showed that those are not signal velocities and therefore are not in conflict with relativity (1910b, 1911g). He also formulated a relativistic theory of hydrodynamics (1911f).

Ignatowski is also known for his work in the field of optics, whereby he founded the only optical-mechanical facility in the Soviet Union. He is mentioned in Richard Adolf Zsigmondy's Nobel Lecture as the inventor of the concentric ball condenser for microscopes.

See also 
History of special relativity

References

Publications 
Relativity

English Wikisource translation: Some General Remarks on the Relativity Principle

More

1875 births
1942 deaths
Physicists from the Russian Empire
Mathematical physicists
Soviet relativity theorists
Microscopists
Optical physicists
Soviet rehabilitations
People from Georgia (country) executed by the Soviet Union
Russian people executed by the Soviet Union
Expatriates from the Russian Empire in Germany